Lasthenia glabrata is a North American species of flowering plant in the family Asteraceae known by the common names yellowray goldfields and yellow-rayed lasthenia. It is endemic to California, where it is a resident of vernal pools and other moist areas in a number of habitat types. It is widespread across much of the state, from San Diego County to Tehama County.

Description

The plant flowers in solitary or loosely clustered flower heads with 7-15 yellow ray florets surrounding numerous disc florets.

The fruit is an achene a few millimeters long with no pappus.

Subspecies
Lasthenia glabrata subsp. glabrata - San Francisco Bay area, Orange County, mid part of Central Valley
Lasthenia glabrata subsp. coulteri (A.Gray) Ornduff - southern California, northern Central Valley

References

External links

Jepson Manual Treatment
Calphotos Photo gallery, University of California

glabrata
Endemic flora of California
Plants described in 1835
Flora without expected TNC conservation status